Poraspis is an extinct genus of heterostracan.  Fossils are found in Late Silurian and Early Devonian marine strata of Norway, Canada and the United States.

References

Cyathaspidida
Silurian first appearances
Devonian extinctions
Fossil taxa described in 1930
Paleozoic jawless fish
Paleozoic fish of North America
Cyathaspidiformes genera